is a Japanese actor and singer.

Career 
Urai debuted as an actor in 2000 in Kamen Rider Kuuga television series. In 2001 he played Mamoru Chiba/Tuxedo Mask in Sailor Moon Musicals and started his career in theatre. In 2004 he portrayed Rudolf in Elisabeth and reprised the role multiple times until 2010. He is also known for portraying Matsukoma in Mr. Nietzsche in the Convenience Store television drama and Light Yagami in Death Note: The Musical.

In 2006, his performance in Flowers for Algernon and My Fair Lady earned Kikuta Kazuo Theatrical Award and in 2009, he received Kinokuniya Theatrical Award for his performance as Henry VI in Henry VI series at New National Theatre, Tokyo. In 2015, he received Yomiuri Theatrical Award for his performance in Flowers for Algernon and Constellations. He also earned The Minister of Education, Culture, Sports, Science and Technology's Art Encouragement Prize for New Artists in Drama department in 2017 for his range of performances in previous year.

On 1 June 2008, he transferred to Candid from Office Palette.

In 2013, he formed StarS, a musical unit with Yoshio Inoue and Ikusaburo Yamazaki and is active as a singer as well. He released his third solo album Various on 15 March 2023.

Performance Credits

Theatre

Television

Voice Acting

Radio 
 Urai Kenji's Dressing Room - Nippon Broadcasting System (AM 1242 kHz／FM 93.0 MHz) since 8 April 2018

Discography

Solo Albums

Cast Recordings 
 Elisabeth - Highlight Live Recordings (Seiyo Uchino ver.) (2004) as Rudolf
 Cinderella Story - Live Recording (2005) as Prince Charles
 Flowers for Algernon - Premiere CD (2006) as Charlie Gordon
 Dance of the Vampires - Highlight Live Recordings (2006) as Alfred
 WILDe・BEAUTY (2009) as Oscar Wilde
 Roméo et Juliette - Highlight Live Recordings (Yuu Shirota ver.) (2011) as Benvolio
 Roméo et Juliette - Highlight Live Recordings (Ikusaburo Yamazaki ver.) (2011) as Benvolio
 Flowers for Algernon (2014) as Charlie Gordon
 Death Note: The Musical - Highlight Live Recordings (Kenji Urai ver.) (2015) as Light Yagami
 The Man Who Laughs - Eternal Love - Highlight Live Recordings (2019) as Gwynplaine

Videos 
VHS
 Pretty Soldier Sailor Moon - The Birth! The Princess of Darkness Black Lady
 Pretty Soldier Sailor Moon - The Birth! The Princess of Darkness Black Lady (Revised Edition) - The Enigma of Planet Nemesis
 Pretty Soldier Sailor Moon 10th Anniversary Festival - Sanctuary of Love
 Pretty Soldier Sailor Moon - Mugen Academy - Mistress Labyrinth
 Would You Like Your Bento Heated Up?
DVD
 WILDe・BEAUTY
 Takarazuka Boys
 Rose and Samurai
 Cymbeline
 Goemon Rock 3: Zipang Punk
 Sherlock Holmes: Secret of the Anderson Family
 Crest of the Royal Family Ra version
 Crest of the Royal Family Hapi version
 Shakespeare in 12th Year of Tenpou Era
 Kenji Urai 20th Anniversary Concert ~Piece~ at Tokyo International Forum 2021.4.20

References

External links 
 
   浦井健治 公式プロフィール
 浦井健治公式ファンクラブページ

Male actors from Tokyo
21st-century Japanese male actors
Japanese male stage actors
Japanese male voice actors
Living people
1981 births
21st-century Japanese singers
21st-century Japanese male singers